Henk Wamsteker (born 6 August 1936) is a Dutch rower. He competed in the men's coxed four event at the 1960 Summer Olympics.

References

External links
 

1936 births
Living people
Dutch male rowers
Olympic rowers of the Netherlands
Rowers at the 1960 Summer Olympics
People from Oegstgeest
Sportspeople from South Holland